Rieux is the name or part of the name of several communes in France:

Rieux, Marne, in the Marne department
Rieux, Morbihan, in the Morbihan department
Rieux, Oise, in the Oise department
Rieux, Seine-Maritime, in the Seine-Maritime department
Rieux-de-Pelleport, in the Ariège department
Rieux-en-Cambrésis, in the Nord department
Rieux-en-Val, in the Aude department
Rieux-Minervois, in the Aude department
Rieux-Volvestre, formerly Rieux, in the Haute-Garonne department